Good to Go is a soundtrack album released on August 1, 1986 in conjunction with the release of the film Good to Go. The album features songs by prominent Washington, D.C.-based go-go bands and Jamaican-dancehall artists from the early-80s.

Track listing

References

External links
Good to Go at Discogs.com

1986 soundtrack albums
Go-go albums
Island Records albums